"No Looking Over My Shoulder" is a song recorded by American country music artist Travis Tritt.  It was released in January 1999 as the second single and title track from the album No More Looking Over My Shoulder.  The song reached #38 on the Billboard Hot Country Singles & Tracks chart.  The song was written by Michael Peterson and Craig Wiseman.

Chart performance

References

1999 singles
1998 songs
Travis Tritt songs
Songs written by Michael Peterson (singer)
Songs written by Craig Wiseman
Song recordings produced by Billy Joe Walker Jr.
Warner Records singles